Petko Petkov (Bulgarian: Петко Петков; 3 August 1946 – 10 January 2020) was a Bulgarian footballer who played as a forward, most notably for Beroe Stara Zagora. He is the club's record goalscorer in the top league with 144 goals in 260 matches.

Career
In his career, Petkov played for Gorubso Madan, Beroe Stara Zagora and Austria Wien.

Beroe
For Beroe, he scored 144 goals in A PFG. This makes him the club's best goalscorer of all time in the top division. During the 1974–75 season, he scored the fantastic 53 goals in the second division, unbeaten record to this day.

For the Bulgaria national football team, he was capped 33 times, scoring 5 goals.

Honours

Club 
Beroe
 Balkans Cup (2): 1967–68; 1969

Austria Wien
 Austrian Bundesliga: 1980–81
 Austrian Cup: 1981–82

Individual 
 Bulgarian League top scorer (2): 1973–74 (20 goals), 1975–76 (19 goals)

References

1946 births
2020 deaths
Bulgarian footballers
Bulgaria international footballers
Association football forwards
PFC Rodopa Smolyan players
PFC Beroe Stara Zagora players
PFC Akademik Svishtov players
FK Austria Wien players
First Professional Football League (Bulgaria) players
Bulgarian expatriate footballers
Bulgarian expatriate sportspeople in Austria
Expatriate footballers in Austria
Bulgarian football managers
PFC Beroe Stara Zagora managers
People from Pazardzhik Province